Colegio Pestalozzi or Pestalozzi Schule may refer to:
Colegio Pestalozzi (Argentina) (German school)
Colegio Pestalozzi (Peru) (Swiss school)